Kot Mubarak is a town and union council of Dera Ghazi Khan District in the Punjab province of Pakistan. It is located at 31°13'35N 70°28'30E and has an altitude of 202 metres (666 feet).

References

Populated places in Dera Ghazi Khan District
Union councils of Dera Ghazi Khan District
Cities and towns in Punjab, Pakistan